The system of orders, decorations, and medals of Timor-Leste was initially established with the passage of The Statute of the National Liberation Combatants in 2006. Under Article 26 of this statute was established a system to recognize the contributions of those who actively participated in the liberation of Timor-Leste. In March 2009, additional medals were established to honor those who, "have served the nation of East Timor by reinforcing the social order and whose actions have contributed significantly to national peace and stability." Finally, in May 2009, the Order of Timor-Leste was established as the highest currently awarded distinction of Timor-Leste.

In June 2011, a system of public safety medals was established for the National Police of East Timor. In December 2015, an Order of Merit of Public Service was established with both individual and institutional categories.

See also
:Category:Orders, decorations, and medals related to service in East Timor

References